The Southern Ontario tornado outbreak of 2005 was a series of thunderstorms on the afternoon of August 19, 2005, that spawned tornadoes damaging homes in the Conestoga Lake, Fergus, and Tavistock areas. A tornado was reported within the Toronto city limits, although this was never officially confirmed by the Meteorological Service of Canada. The storms morphed into heavy rain cells when reaching Toronto. The Insurance Bureau of Canada has estimated that insured losses were the highest in the province's history, exceeding 500 million Canadian dollars, two and a half times that of Ontario's losses during the 1998 ice storm and the second largest loss event in Canadian history until another event of torrential rain of July 8, 2013 (1 billion CAD).

Meteorological events 

On the early morning of August 19, a low-pressure area was sitting over Northern Michigan with a cold front southwestward. This same system had been causing an outbreak of tornadoes over Wisconsin the day before. All of these were very favorable for the development of severe thunderstorms. Furthermore, the wind shear in the lower troposphere was creating a large helicity value conducive to a tornado potential.

With the advancing cold front, two lines of thunderstorms developed. The first one was near Stratford, Ontario ( west of Kitchener), and spread as far north as Georgian Bay near Collingwood, Ontario while the second one was following behind near the shores of Lake Huron. They tracked eastward and reached as far as Oshawa during the afternoon. Dozens of storm cells populated the line, two of them developing into tornadic supercells. Severe thunderstorm warnings were sent, mentioning the possibility of tornadoes in view of the radar output and the potential analysis.

The main storm, later dubbed the Toronto Supercell, spawned a first tornado tracking through Milverton to Conestogo Lake (west of Elmira) from 12:40 to 1:20 pm local time. A second twister moved from Salem to Lake Belwood (north of Guelph), passing just to the north of Fergus 10 minutes later. When the storm came close to the Greater Toronto Area, a tornado warning was issued, but the storm changed its characteristics.

Storm's characteristics 

The Toronto Supercell maintained all the characteristics of a tornado producer as it approached the city. Convective storm detection showed on weather radars a hook echo, a BWER and a strong mesocyclone but the vortex left the ground after the second tornado. Studies were made to try to explain the change in behavior to an extremely high producer of rain. One area of Thornhill, just north of the Toronto City limits recorded  of rain in less than one hour.

Toronto is situated by Lake Ontario and a lake breeze often develops during the day. This wind brings cooler air at the surface and causes a marine temperature inversion which could have been enough to keep the rotation aloft. This drop could equally have cut off the rotation from the surface.

The lightning shows that there was a strong peak during the F2 tornadoes, dominated by the positive cloud-to-ground strikes. Studies have shown that this is often the case in tornadic storms. It was followed by a sharp drop and then another peak, but this one dominated by negative lightning during the flooding phase of the storm.

Impacts 

The twisters uprooted hundreds of trees, chewed the limbs off of countless others, downed power lines, tossed cars and trucks aside, and ripped into several homes, cottages and barns. In Guelph and Orangeville, 10,000 residents were left without power. No deaths or injuries were reported.

In Toronto,  of rain fell in one hour in North York and surrounding area, double the amount left by Hurricane Hazel in 1954 (the heaviest rain from Hazel fell over Etobicoke and the Airport area). At the Meteorological Service of Canada (MSC) Downsview headquarters,  of rain fell,  of which occurred in less than an hour, a record for any storm in Toronto. Rainfall totals from the storm exceeded  in parts in Vaughan. A volunteer storm spotter reported a tornado in the north part of the city but it was not confirmed by Environment Canada.

The rain washed out a portion of Finch Avenue near Sentinel Ave in North York. It overflowed storm drains which caused severe basement flooding to many thousands of homes and two floors of the MSC building. Around Toronto, torrential rains snarled traffic and stranded drivers. Fire services responded to more than 1,000 calls. Marine services personnel rescued four people who fell into the fast-moving currents of the Don River.

See also

References

External links
 Report on the Fergus tornado by Dave Patrick, a storm chaser, with pictures of the damages
 Weather hazard statictics in Ontario by Environment Canada

History of Toronto
2005 meteorology
2005 in Ontario
Tornadoes in Ontario
Tornadoes of 2005
August 2005 events in Canada
2005-08-19